The Château du Vigneau is a former winery transformed into a champagne house, located in Bayonne, Pyrénées-Atlantiques, France.

It has been officially registered as a Historical Monument since 2009, as well as its railings and entrance portal. It is one of the 22 Historical Monuments in Bayonne.

History 
After the violent battle of Bayonne in 1814, the winery house was restored in 1848, then transformed by architect Gomez in 1918.

References 

Vigneau
19th-century establishments in France
Buildings and structures completed in the 19th century
Buildings and structures completed in 1918
Monuments historiques of Nouvelle-Aquitaine
Bayonne
Wineries of France
Champagne producers
20th-century architecture in France
19th-century architecture in France